The Class BB 8700 electric locomotives were rebuilt from the BB 8500 (or BB 88500) as the first subseries for the growth in Maurienne.

Indeed, while the CC 6500 participated in this task, the reorganization of traction in Maurienne had led them to other services. These were renumbered as Class BB 8700.

Conversion
The conversion consisted particularly in the modification and expansion of the driving cabs at one end, by removing an air compressor. The BB 8700 were permanently coupled to run in pairs, with the unmodified cabs remaining in the middle, at the permanent coupling.

Service
These locomotives, assigned to freight activity and attached to the Chambéry depot, were used exclusively on the Maurienne line for banking freight trains. They ran exclusively as paired units.

By 2005, the end of their career related to the reorganization of Fret SNCF and pushed them quickly towards withdrawal. Banking locomotives became less necessary with the introduction of the more powerful Class BB 36000. If the occasion arose, a Class BB 7200 was used.

See also
 List of SNCF classes

References

Further reading

Standard gauge electric locomotives of France
SNCF locomotives
Railway locomotives introduced in 2001
B-B locomotives

Freight locomotives 
Rebuilt locomotives